The Vintonville Historic District is a residential historic district to the east of the center of Westborough, Massachusetts.  The  district includes 80 properties on Cottage, Elm, Spruce, Green, Pine, Brigham, Cedar, South, and Beach Streets.  The area, which consists of modestly sized houses built on smaller lots mainly between 1860 and 1890, is named for Otis Vinton, who platted out some of the early streets in the area.

The district was listed on the National Register of Historic Places in 2006.

See also
National Register of Historic Places listings in Worcester County, Massachusetts

References

Historic districts in Worcester County, Massachusetts
Buildings and structures in Westborough, Massachusetts
National Register of Historic Places in Worcester County, Massachusetts
Historic districts on the National Register of Historic Places in Massachusetts